Tugger may refer generally to something that tugs.

It may also refer to:

 A tugboat
 A restoration device, for restoring foreskin after circumcision
 The Protei-5 Russian diver propulsion vehicle
Steve Waugh[Tugger]
For characters named Tugger, see:
 Rum Tum Tugger, a character from a poem by T. S. Eliot and who appears in the musical Cats
 Tugger, a character from South Park episode The New Terrance and Phillip Movie Trailer

See also:

 Coat-tugger